Ildar Hafizov (born 30 January 1988) is an Uzbek-American Greco-Roman wrestler of Tatar heritage, who competes in the featherweight category. Before his change of domicile to the United States in 2014, Hafizov represented his native Uzbekistan at the 2008 Summer Olympics, and has picked up the silver medal in his respective division at the 2011 Asian Wrestling Championships, coincidentally in his home city Tashkent, losing out to Kyrgyzstan's Arsen Eraliev.

Hafizov competed for the Uzbek wrestling squad in the men's 55 kg class at the 2008 Summer Olympics in Beijing. He lost the first prelims match to Russia's Nazyr Mankiev, who was able to score three points each in two straight periods, leaving Hafizov with a single point. Because his opponent advanced further into the final match, Hafizov offered another shot for the bronze medal by entering the repechage bouts. He was defeated by Serbia's Kristijan Fris in the first round, with a technical score of 1–5.

In May 2015, Hafizov enlisted in the United States Army. He is currently a sergeant. Along with serving as a motor vehicle operator within the U.S. Army, he is also a member of the U.S. Army World Class Athlete Program.

At U.S. Open 2017 he won a gold medal at 59 kg categories.

He has qualified to represent the United States at the 2020 Summer Olympics.

3x World team member (2017, 2019 and 2022).

References

External links

NBC 2008 Olympics profile

1988 births
Living people
Uzbekistani male sport wrestlers
American Muslims
American people of Tatar descent
American military Olympians
Olympic wrestlers of Uzbekistan
Wrestlers at the 2008 Summer Olympics
Wrestlers at the 2010 Asian Games
Uzbekistani emigrants to the United States
Uzbekistani people of Tatar descent
Tatar sportspeople
Uzbekistani Muslims
Sportspeople from Tashkent
American male sport wrestlers
Asian Games competitors for Uzbekistan
Wrestlers at the 2019 Pan American Games
Pan American Games medalists in wrestling
Pan American Games bronze medalists for the United States
Medalists at the 2019 Pan American Games
United States Army non-commissioned officers
Wrestlers at the 2020 Summer Olympics
Olympic wrestlers of the United States